Nicolas Valcik is an author and a higher education administrator. Valcik was previously the Managing Director of Institutional Research at Texas Tech University. Valcik has authored a series of notable case study books on strategic planning and analysis. His books have earned him various Taylor & Francis contracts.

Early life 
Valcik was born in Dallas, Texas is of Czech descent and grew up in Plano, Texas where he worked as a swim instructor and lifeguard for the cities of Plano and Richardson.

In 1989, Valcik graduated from Plano East Senior High School in Plano, Texas and then initially attended The University of Texas at Arlington where he began competing in ISSF Collegiate Pistol as a member of the university's pistol team. As part of the pistol team, he competed in Collegiate Nationals in Free Pistol in 1991.

Education 
After 1991, Valcik transferred and attended simultaneously Collin County Community College and The University of Texas at Dallas. He formed The University of Texas at Dallas ISSF Pistol Team and competed from 1992 to 1994. Valcik obtained his Associates of Arts in Political science from Collin County Community College and his Bachelor of Arts in Interdisciplinary Studies in May 1994.

Valcik continued his education at The University of Texas at Dallas, in which he obtained his Master's degree in Public Affairs in 1996 and worked for two municipalities during this timeframe (e.g. City of Duncanville – Economic Development Corporation and the City of McKinney). After graduation, he worked for Nortel Networks as a Recruiting Analyst and Competitive Analyst/Consultant. In 1997, Valcik began working for The University of Texas at Dallas in the Office of Strategic Planning and Analysis.

Valcik was inducted into Pi Alpha Alpha Honor Society and received his PhD in Public Affairs from The University of Texas at Dallas and in 2005. His dissertation chair was Lawrence J. Redlinger who mentored him through his dissertation titled The Protection of Physical Assets in Research Universities for Biological HAZMAT: Policies, Practices and Improvements. The dissertation researched Hazardous Materials (HAZMAT) safety and security at public research universities in the context of the Public Health Security and Bioterrorism Response Act of 2002.

In 2012 Valcik was elected to Sigma Xi as a member and in 2013 he was elected as a member to the American Chemical Society.

Career 
In addition to his administrative position at The University of Texas at Dallas in the Office of Strategic Planning and Analysis from 1997 to 2013, Valcik was also a clinical lecturer (2007) and later a clinical assistant professor (2008–2013) to the Public Affairs program in the School of Economic, Political and Policy Sciences at The University of Texas at Dallas.

Dr. Valcik was the Director of Institutional Research for West Virginia University from 2013 to 2017, was the Executive Director of Institutional Effectiveness at Central Washington University from 2017 to 2019, the Director of Institutional Research & Business Intelligence at the University of Texas of the Permian Basin from 2019 to 2020 and was the Managing Director of Institutional Research at Texas Tech University from 2020 to 2022.

Research 
Valcik has authored a series of notable case study books on strategic planning and analysis as well as books on public administration topics (e.g. Human Resources, Homeland Security, Non-Profit Organizations and Emergency Management. Throughout his publications, Valcik works on tying in theoretical aspects (e.g. organizational theory) to applied issues in public administration and higher education administration. Additionally, Valcik has worked as a consultant to assess public educational programs such as the Kentucky College Coaching program.

Publications

Books

Articles

Personal activities 

Valcik is a Life Member of the USJA , the USJJF , USA Judo and with USA-TJK . Valcik holds a Black Belt- Shodan rank in Kodokan Judo and a Black Belt - Shodan rank in Heike Ryu Jujitsu . He has been trained by Vince Tamura and James R. Webb.

References 

Living people
American organizational theorists
People from Dallas
University of Texas at Arlington alumni
University of Texas at Dallas alumni
West Virginia University people
Year of birth missing (living people)